Grandfathered is an American sitcom created by Daniel Chun for the Fox Broadcasting Company. Originally titled Grandpa, the show was picked up to series on May 8, 2015, and premiered on September 29, 2015. On October 15, 2015, Fox ordered an additional six scripts for the first season. On October 28, 2015, Fox ordered a full season of 22 episodes for the first season.
On May 12, 2016, Fox canceled the series after one season.

Synopsis
Grandfathered details the life of a bachelor and restaurant owner who discovers that he has a son as well as a granddaughter from a relationship that occurred over 25 years prior to the events of the series.

Cast

Main
 John Stamos as James "Jimmy" Martino, a 50-year-old, lifelong bachelor and successful restaurant owner who discovers that he has both a son and a granddaughter. He's considered to be self-absorbed, career-obsessed, and inexperienced at parenthood. As the series progresses, his egotistical personality slowly begins to fade away, as he realizes that the son he never knew had needed a father, and Jimmy now wants to make it up to him.
 Paget Brewster as Sara Kingsley, Gerald's mother, Edie's grandmother, and Jimmy's ex-girlfriend. She broke up with Jimmy due to his self-absorbed and career-obsessed personality. After their breakup, she found out that she was pregnant with Gerald and kept it hidden from Jimmy for over 25 years.
 Josh Peck as Gerald E. Kingsley, Jimmy and Sara's 25-year-old son who also has a baby daughter.
 Christina Milian as Vanessa, Gerald's best friend and his child's mother with whom he is in love. She is usually unaware of Gerald's attempts to woo her.
 Ravi Patel as Ravi Gupta, the head chef at Jimmy's restaurant.
 Kelly Jenrette as Annelise Wilkinson, Jimmy's assistant and right-hand woman who is openly a lesbian.

Recurring
 Layla and Emelia Golfieri as Edie, Gerald and Vanessa's baby daughter and Jimmy and Sara's granddaughter.
 Abby Walker as Cindy, a ditzy and openly bisexual server working at Jimmy's restaurant.
 A.J. Rivera as Victor, a chef working beneath Ravi at Jimmy's restaurant.
 Andy Daly as Bruce, Sara's on-and-off boyfriend. He was the only father figure Gerald had growing up.
 Regina Hall as Catherine Sanders, a CEO whom Jimmy dates and with whom he has a rare "adult" relationship.
 Michael Trucco as Craig, an old flame of Sara's whom she attempts to reconnect with after Bruce leaves for China.

Reception
Grandfathered has received generally positive reviews from critics. On Rotten Tomatoes the series has a rating of 68%, based on 44 reviews, with an average rating of 6/10. The site's critical consensus reads, "John Stamos is as handsome and charming as ever, but Grandfathereds jokes are tired and schmaltzy." On Metacritic, the series has a score of 62 out of 100, based on 22 critics, indicating "generally favorable reviews".

Episodes

Home media

References

External links
 
 

2015 American television series debuts
2016 American television series endings
2010s American LGBT-related comedy television series
2010s American single-camera sitcoms
English-language television shows
Fox Broadcasting Company original programming
Television series about dysfunctional families
Television series by ABC Studios
Television series by 20th Century Fox Television
Television shows set in California
American LGBT-related sitcoms